Victor and Victoria is a 1957 German musical comedy film directed by Karl Anton and starring Johanna von Koczian, Georg Thomalla and Johannes Heesters. A woman gains success on the stage by pretending to be a female impersonator. It is a remake of the 1933 film Victor and Victoria, which had starred Renate Müller. The film's sets were designed by Emil Hasler and Walter Kutz.

Cast

Johanna von Koczian as Erika Lohr
Georg Thomalla as Viktor Hempel
Johannes Heesters as Jean Perrot
Annie Cordy as Titine
Boy Gobert as Lacoste
Carola Höhn as Marquise de Sevigné
Werner Finck as Hinz
Franz-Otto Krüger as detective commissioner
Kurt Pratsch-Kaufmann as Wurstmaxe
Gerd Frickhöffer as hotel doorman
Stanislav Ledinek as host in the beer bar
Waltraut Runze as Pressedame
Kurt Vespermann as Intendant
Henry Lorenzen as Tier-Dresseur
Erich Poremski
Valérie Camille as dancer
Alicia Márquez as dancer
Jack del Rio as dancer
Les Romano's Brothers as dancer
Die Vier Sunnies as singer
Das Cornell-Trio as singer
Ernie Bieler as singer
Wolfgang Gruner as hairdresser
Hilla Höfer as waitress
Edhilt Rochell as secretary
Ralf Wolter as hairdresser

References

External links

1957 musical comedy films
German musical comedy films
West German films
Films directed by Karl Anton
Remakes of German films
Cross-dressing in film
Films set in Paris
UFA GmbH films
1950s German films